Ōtaua is a rural community in the Far North District and Northland Region of New Zealand's North Island.

The local Pukerātā or Ōtaua Marae is a meeting place of the Ngāpuhi hapū of Ngāi Tāwake and Ngaitu te Auru / Ngaitu. It includes Te Rau Tawainui meeting house.

There are also three Ngāi Tāwake ki te Waoku marae southeast of the main village: Te Huehue Marae and meeting house, Ngāi Tāwake Marae and meeting house, and Paripari Marae and meeting house.

References

Far North District
Populated places in the Northland Region